This article provides a list of the maritime ports and harbours of Turkmenistan.

Maritime ports and harbours

Caspian Sea
 Turkmenbashy International Seaport
 Alaja Loading Terminal (oil)
 Ekerem Loading Terminal (oil)
 Kenar Loading Terminal (oil)
Garabogaz Loading Terminal (urea)
Gyýanly Loading Terminal (polymers)
Port of Hazar (oil, operated by Dragon Oil)

Amu Darya
Turkmenabat River Port

See also 
 Railways in Turkmenistan
 Transport in Turkmenistan
 Turkmenistan Airlines

References

Transport in Turkmenistan
Ports and harbours of Turkmenistan